Íñigo Antonio Laviada Hernández (born 22 May 1961) is a Mexican politician from the National Action Party. From 2006 to 2009 he served as Deputy of the LX Legislature of the Mexican Congress representing Veracruz.

References

1961 births
Living people
Politicians from Veracruz
National Action Party (Mexico) politicians
21st-century Mexican politicians
Deputies of the LX Legislature of Mexico
Members of the Chamber of Deputies (Mexico) for Veracruz
Monterrey Institute of Technology and Higher Education alumni